María Cristina Rota Fernández (born 1945) is an Argentine-born playwright, actress, director and popular acting coach settled in Spain.

Biography 
Cristina Rota was born in 1945 in La Plata, Argentina. She has ancestors from the Canary Islands and Navarre. She studied Philosophy and Arts, after which she trained her acting chops, and—already in Argentina—began to primarily focus on drama coaching. With actor  (kidnapped and assassinated during the Videla dictatorship) she had María and Juan Diego. She left Argentina for Spain in 1978 with her children, while she was pregnant of a third child, from another partner. In addition to her three children, all thespians, many famous Spanish actors have trained in her school, including Penélope Cruz, Antonio de la Torre, Marta Etura and Raúl Arévalo.

Filmography
Colores, 2003
Party Line, 1994
En penumbra, 1987
Virtudes Bastián, 1986
La reina del mate, 1985

As a producer
Los abajo firmantes, 2003

References

External links

Cristina Rota's School website

1945 births
Living people
20th-century Argentine actresses
Argentine emigrants to Spain
Argentine expatriates in Spain
Argentine film actresses
People from La Plata
Acting coaches
Acting teachers